The khorovod or horovod (or ,  ,) is an East Slavic and pagan art form and one of the oldest dances of Russia with its more than 1,000 years history. It is a combination of a circle dance and chorus singing, similar to the choreia of ancient Greece. The dance was also known in Rus' as karagod, tanok and krug.

Etymology 
The term khorovod probably descended from the Greek Choreia (Ancient Greek: χορεία). Greek culture had a strong impact on Rus' culture. It is related to choreia (Greek circle dance), kolo dance (South Slavic circle dance in Serbia, Croatia and Bosnia), hora dance (Balkans), kochari (Armenian and Azerbaijani folk dance).

Origin and characteristics 
The most significant features of the khorovod dance is to hold hands or the little finger of the partners while dancing in a circle.

The circle dance symbolised in ancient Russian culture "moving around the sun" and was a pagan rite with the meaning of unity and friendship. The female organizer or leader of the dance was called khorovodnitsa.

Regional difference in Russia 
The khorovod dance has own characteristics in the different regions of Old Russia.

In the northern Russian regions, the round dance was known for its gentle and subtle manner, while in the central Russian regions, the dance was more cheerful and lighthearted. Russian folk songs accompanied the dance. The people kicked, clapped and made quick and energetic movements. Dances in southern Russia, with its warm, mild weather, were famous for their rapid, hot-blooded movements and complex patterns, embodying strength, boundless energy and youth.

See also 

 Hora (dance)
 Kolo (dance)
 Bulgarian dances

References

External links 
 Khorovod description and history

Belarusian culture
Circle dances
Belarusian folk dances
Russian folk dances
Ukrainian folk dances